Worth Dying For is the self-titled debut album of the Modesto, California-based contemporary worship band Worth Dying For (now Fearless BND). It was released by Integrity Music in April 2008.

Trivia 

Joth Hunt, of the Australian worship conference movement Planetshakers, was flown into the United States to help produce this album. Henry Seely also from Planetshakers also worked on this album. The original title of this album when it was an independent release was "Ammunition". Two songs on the original release, "Great" and "To Love You" were replaced by "Let it Out" and "At Your Cross".

Track listing 

 Revolution (Micah Berteau)
 Let It Out (Sean Loche, Berteau)
 Unite (Loche)
 Crazy (Berteau, Christy Johnson)
 Die To Live (Berteau)
 Holy (Berteau)
 Consume Me Now (Loche)
 All We (Loche)
 At Your Cross (Berteau, Josh O'Haire)
 My Only One (Berteau, Loche)
 Take Me (Berteau)
 Lose Myself (Johnson)
 The Change (Loche and Jennifer Avelino)
 Unafraid (Johnson)
 Infiltrate (Loche)

Chart performance 
WDF charted at #166 on Billboard Magazine's Billboard 200 chart and #11 on their Christian Albums chart.

References

External links 
Integrity Music Album Page
Worth Dying For Official Website
Modesto Bee - Band out to 'break mold' of worship music

2008 albums
Fearless BND albums